Abromavičius is a Lithuanian language surname. Notable people with the surname include:

Aivaras Abromavičius (born 1976), Ukrainian Minister of Economy and Trade
Aleksas Abromavičius (born 1984), Lithuanian discus thrower
Kazys Abromavičius (1928-2008), Lithuanian painter

Lithuanian-language surnames
Patronymic surnames